NYP can refer to:

New York Philharmonic, a symphony orchestra in New York City
New York Post, a newspaper
Pennsylvania Station (New York City), a railroad station
Nanyang Polytechnic, a polytechnic in Ang Mo Kio, Singapore
NewYork-Presbyterian Hospital, a hospital in New York City
North Yorkshire Police, the police force covering the English county of North Yorkshire
NYP Trinity Limited, a privately owned electronics and industrial product trading company
Not Yet published, a term used in the book publishing industry